Qaleh-ye Now (also Romanized as Qal‘eh Now; also known as Qal‘eh-ye Now Abraj) is a village in Abarj Rural District, Dorudzan District, Marvdasht County, Fars Province, Iran. At the 2006 census, its population was 752, in 153 families.

References 

Populated places in Marvdasht County